Marcus Augustine Conant (born May 11, 1936, in Jacksonville, Florida) is an American dermatologist and one of the first physicians to diagnose and treat Acquired Immune Deficiency Syndrome (AIDS) in 1981.  He helped create one of the largest private AIDS clinics, was a founder of the San Francisco AIDS Foundation, and his work contributed to development of some of today's top HIV medications. He has written over 70 publications on the treatment of AIDS.

Conant graduated from Duke University in 1957 with a B.S. in Zoology.  In 1961, Conant graduated from Duke University College of Medicine and interned at Duke University Medical Center.  Conant served in the United States Air Force as a flight surgeon, on active duty from 1962 to 1964, and continuing as a reservist until 1967.

In 1964, Conant joined the University of California San Francisco Medical Center as a dermatology resident.  In 1967, he received his first academic appointment, as an instructor in clinical dermatology.  Over the years, Conant rose up the academic ladder, and in 1984, he was appointed clinical professor of dermatology.

While he was an associate professor at UCSF, Conant first identified Kaposi's Sarcoma and AIDS in patients, including early AIDS activist Bobbi Campbell.

He was the lead plaintiff in judicial decision protecting the First Amendment right of physicians to recommend the use of medical marijuana to people living with HIV and AIDS.

In 2010, Conant closed his practice and moved to New York, citing rising costs and difficulties in dealing with health insurance companies. He stated, "I'm sorry to have to leave my patients, and a lot of them are sorry I had to leave, but it's time. This is only symptomatic of a much bigger problem we have in this country with health care." He continues to consult with researchers on a reported association of a virus with chronic fatigue syndrome and autism.

References

External links 
 Curriculum vitae at Conant Foundation
 Oral Histories on the AIDS Epidemic in San Francisco, from UC Berkeley

Living people
American dermatologists
1936 births
HIV/AIDS researchers
University of California, San Francisco faculty